Suillus grevillei (commonly known as Greville's bolete and larch bolete) is a mycorrhizal mushroom with a tight, brilliantly coloured cap, shiny and wet looking with its mucous slime layer. The hymenium easily separates from the flesh of the cap, with a central stalk that is quite slender. The species has a ring or a tight-fitting annular zone.

Description
Suillus grevillei is a mushroom with a 5–10 cm (2–4 in) cap colored from citrus yellow to burnt orange, that is at first hemispherical, then bell-shaped, and finally flattened. It has a sticky skin, often with veil remnants on the edge, short tubes of yellow (possibly staining brownish) which descend down to the bottom of its cylindrical stalk (6–10 x 1–2 cm), which is yellowish above the ring area with streaks of reddish brown below. The flesh is yellow, staining brown.

The thin meat has consistency at first but then quickly becomes soft. It has an odor reminiscent of rumpled Pelargonium geranium leaves.

It grows in the soil of mixed forests, not always at the foot of larch (can be quite some distance away) with which it lives in symbiosis. It grows from June until November.

Suillus grevillei is an edible mushroom (without consistency nor flavor) if the slimy cuticle is removed off the cap. This mucousy skin layer is what is known to cause intestinal issues, as is the case with several other Suillus such as Slippery Jack (S. luteus) or Jill (S. salmonicolor); often considered to be not worth the work.

Its name is derived from Robert Kaye Greville.

Habitat and distribution
Grows only under larch trees. Widespread in North America and Europe. In Asia, it has been recorded from Taiwan.

Chemistry
The fungus produces grevillin which is characteristic of this fungus. The genetic and enzymatic basis for atromentin, the precursor to various pulvinic acid-type pigments, has been characterized (an atromentin synthetase by the name, GreA). A cosmid library (31 249 bp in total) has been made from the genome. The estimated gene density based on the cosmid library is 1 per 3900 bp of genomic DNA. The genome has a GC content of 49.8%.

See also
List of North American boletes

References

Works in French
 Régis Courtecuisse, Bernard Duhem : Guide des champignons de France et d'Europe (Delachaux & Niestlé, 1994-2000).
 Marcel Bon : Champignons de France et d'Europe occidentale (Flammarion, 2004)
 Dr Ewaldt Gerhardt : Guide Vigot des champignons (Vigot, 1999) - 
 Roger Phillips : Les champignons (Solar, 1981) - 
 Thomas Laessoe, Anna Del Conte : L'Encyclopédie des champignons (Bordas, 1996) - 
 Peter Jordan, Steven Wheeler : Larousse saveurs - Les champignons (Larousse, 1996) - 
 G. Becker, Dr L. Giacomoni, J Nicot, S. Pautot, G. Redeuihl, G. Branchu, D. Hartog, A. Herubel, H. Marxmuller, U. Millot et C. Schaeffner : Le guide des hampignons (Reader's Digest, 1982) - 
 Henri Romagnesi : Petit atlas des champignons (Bordas, 1970) - 

This article is based on a translation of the corresponding article on the French Wikipedia.

External links
 
 Baura G, Szaro TM, Bruns TD. 1992. Gastrosuillus laricinius is a recent derivative of Suillus grevillei: molecular evidence. Mycologia 84(4): 592–597.

grevillei
Fungi of Asia
Fungi of Europe
Edible fungi
Fungi described in 1945